The House of Representatives is the lower chamber of the bicameral legislative branch of Liberia, and together with the Senate comprises the Legislature of Liberia. The number of seats is fixed by law at 73, with each county being apportioned a number of seats based on its percentage of the national population. House members represent single-member districts within the counties drawn up by the National Elections Commission and serve six-year terms. The House meets at the Capitol Building in Monrovia.

The primary purpose of the House is to pass bills in conjunction with the Senate so that they may be sent to the president for signature or veto. The House also holds the exclusive right to introduce revenue bills into the Legislature, as well as to impeach the president, the vice president and judges upon the concurrence of two-thirds of its members. The House is led by the Speaker of the House, elected at the beginning of each new legislature from among its members.

Membership

Eligibility 
Article 30 of the Constitution sets four requirements for members of the House: 1) they must possess Liberian citizenship, 2) must be at least twenty-five years old, 3) must have been domiciled in the district which they represent for at least one year prior to their election, and 4) must be a taxpayer. Under the 1847 Constitution, House members were required to own a certain value of real estate within their district, which in effect limited the ability of indigenous citizens to be elected to the House. Property ownership as a requirement for election was eliminated in the current Constitution.

Seat apportionment 
Seats in the House are apportioned among the counties of Liberia in proportion to their percentage of the population according to the national census, with each county being guaranteed a minimum of two seats. Article 80(d) of the Constitution states, "Each constituency shall have an approximately equal population of 20,000, or such number of citizens as the legislature shall prescribe in keeping with population growth." Furthermore, the Constitution limits the number of House seats that the Legislature may create to 100. Currently, the number of seats is set at 73, averaging approximately 55,000 citizens per seat.

The National Elections Commission is responsible for reapportioning the seats among the counties following the conclusion of the national census every ten years. Under Article 80(e) of the Constitution, the National Elections Commission is also required to redraw the constituencies within each county at the same time as reapportionment in order to ensure that all of the constituencies are as equal in population as possible. House districts must be wholly contained within a single county.

The current seat distribution among the counties is as follows:

Elections 
Article 83(b) of the 1985 Constitution originally established a two-round system for House elections, whereby if no candidate received a majority of the vote, a second election contested by the two candidates with the highest number of votes was held one month later. The Accra Peace Accord temporarily suspended this provision for the 2005 legislative elections, which utilized the first-past-the-post (FPTP) voting system. The by-elections held between 2006 and 2011 to fill vacant House seats reverted to the two-round system. However, Article 83(b) was amended by referendum in 2011 to require FPTP voting in all future legislative elections.

Term 
Representatives serve a term of six years, with no limit on the number of times a representative may be reelected. The 1847 Constitution originally set House terms at two years, though this was increased to four years by referendum in 1905. Under the draft version of the 1985 Constitution, representatives would have served four-year terms, though this was changed to six years by the People's Redemption Council prior to the Constitution's ratification in 1985.

Oath 
The Constitution requires all representatives to take an oath or affirmation upon assuming their office. The following oath is specified by the Constitution:

Midterm vacancies 
In the event of a representative's death, resignation, incapacity or expulsion prior to the completion of his or her term, the House is required to notify the National Elections Commission within 30 days of the vacancy. The NEC then carries out a by-election within 90 days of such notification to fill the vacancy. Representatives elected in a by-election are only elected to serve the remainder of their predecessor's term.

Duties

Legislation 
Bills may originate in either the House or the Senate, though the House is granted exclusive power under Article 34(d)(i) of the Constitution to introduce revenue bills into the Legislature. Bills originating in the House, including revenue bills, may be amended by the Senate and sent back to the House. Both chambers are required to pass the same bill in order for it to be sent to the president for signature or veto. If differences exist in the two versions passed by the House and the Senate, a conference committee made up of members of both chambers may be formed to negotiate a single bill for passage by the chambers.

Checks and balances 
The Constitution grants the House the sole power to impeach the president, the vice president and judges upon the concurrence of two-thirds of its members. Furthermore, the House must, along with Senate, approve any treaties or other international agreements signed by the president. Should the president veto any bill passed by the House and the Senate, the veto may be overturned by a vote of two-thirds of the members in each chamber.

Structure

Sessions 
The House holds one regular session every year, beginning on the second working Monday of January and ending on August 31, with a two-week break for Easter. Under Article 32(b) of the Constitution, the House, by concurrence of one-fourth of its members and one-fourth of the members of the Senate, or the president, on his or her own initiative, may extend the session past its adjournment or call for an extraordinary session outside of the regular session. Plenary sessions are held every Tuesday and Thursday, with committees meeting on Monday and Wednesday.

Leadership 
At the convocation of each new legislature, the representatives elect a Speaker of the House from among their members to preside over the House. The House also elects a Deputy Speaker, who presides over the House in the absence of the Speaker. Both the Speaker and the Deputy Speaker serve for the entire term of the Legislature and may be removed from their positions by the concurrence of two-thirds of the representatives. In the event of a vacancy in the speakership, the Deputy Speaker serves as Speaker until the election of a replacement within sixty days.

Committees 
Article 38 of the Constitution empowers both houses of the Legislature to create both committees and sub-committees, with the only caveat being that the Committee on Ways, Means, Finance and Budget is required to consist of one representative from each county. The Speaker appoints all chairpersons and members of the House's committees. In the 52nd Legislature, the thirty-three standing committees were:

Current representatives

See also 
 List of speakers of the House of Representatives of Liberia
 National Transitional Legislative Assembly of Liberia – the country's unicameral legislative body during the transition period (October 2003-January 2006)

References

External links 
 

Liberia
Legislature of Liberia